James Kennedy McGuire, (July 12, 1868 – June 30, 1923) was the Mayor of Syracuse, New York from 1895 to 1902. He was a member of Tammany Hall.

Biography
In 1902 he was Chairman of the Executive Committee of the Democratic State Committee. When indicted in 1913 he fled to Puerto Rico.

References

1868 births
1923 deaths
Mayors of Syracuse, New York